The 2016–17 Dynamo Dresden season was the 67th season in the football club's history and the first season since 2013–14 in the second division of German football, the 2. Bundesliga and 6th overall. In addition to the domestic league, Dynamo Dresden also participated in this season's edition of the DFB-Pokal. This was the 64th season for Dynamo Dresden in the Rudolf-Harbig-Stadion, located in Dresden, Germany. The season covered a period from 1 July 2016 to 30 June 2017.

Players

Squad information

Transfers

Summer

In:

Out:

Winter

In:

Out:

Friendly matches

Competitions

2. Bundesliga

League table

Results summary

Results by round

Matches

DFB-Pokal

Squad and statistics

|-
! colspan=14 style=background:#ffcc00; text-align:center| Goalkeepers

|-
! colspan=14 style=background:#ffcc00; text-align:center| Defenders

|-
! colspan=14 style=background:#ffcc00; text-align:center| Midfielders

|-
! colspan=14 style=background:#ffcc00; text-align:center| Forwards

|-
! colspan=14 style=background:#ffcc00; text-align:center| Players transferred out during the season

|}

References

Dynamo Dresden seasons
Dresden, Dynamo